The Hunter Hurricanes Water Polo Club is an Australian club water polo team that competes in the National Water Polo League.  They have a men's team and a women's team and are based in the Hunter Region.

References

External links
 

Water polo clubs in Australia
Sports clubs established in 2006
2006 establishments in Australia
Sport in Newcastle, New South Wales
Sports teams in Newcastle, New South Wales